Eugenia Rico is a Spanish novelist, poet and journalist.

Life
Coming from a poor family she won her first literary award at the age of five. She studied Law and International Relations in Oviedo, Toulouse and Brussels but gave up everything to dedicate herself to literature. She traveled through the whole world, including India, South America, China and Africa.

She started writing and, after a difficult period in which she even sold flowers in the street, she worked in the reconversion of mining communities. Her first novel "Sad Lovers" was a great success winning her wide recognition. Afterwards she published "The White Death" (dealing with the loss of his little brother).

She contributes to El País, El Mundo, La Revista de occidente, La Nouvelle Revue Francaise and  Der Spiegel. She has been the first Spaniard selected as a resident in the prestigious International Writing Program at the University of Iowa.

External links 
Official website
 Leo Zelada talks with Eugenia Rico, via culturamas.es
A place in the word. 1 via youtube.com
A place in the word. 2 via youtube.com
A place in the word. 3 via youtube.com
Eugenia Rico's blog
 Eugenia Rico in the University of Iowa famous Writer's Workshop

1972 births
Living people
Spanish women novelists
Magic realism writers
Spanish women journalists
Spanish women poets
Spanish women short story writers
Spanish short story writers
21st-century Spanish women writers
People from Oviedo
Writers from Asturias
21st-century Spanish novelists
21st-century Spanish poets
International Writing Program alumni
21st-century short story writers